In Greek mythology, Psamathe is a Nereid, one of the fifty daughters of the sea god Nereus and the Oceanid Doris. By Aeacus, the king of Aegina, she is the mother of a son, Phocus. When Phocus is killed by his half-brothers Peleus and Telamon, Psamathe sends a giant wolf at Peleus' herd.

Family 

Psamathe is one of the fifty Nereids, daughters of Nereus and Doris. By Aeacus, the king of Aegina, she is the mother of a son, Phocus. She is later the wife of Proteus, king of Egypt, by whom she has a son, Theoclymenos, and a daughter, Eido (later known as Theonoe).

Mythology 

There are two myths which involve Psamathe. The first is the story of her violation by Aeacus. Upon his advances, she transforms herself into a seal in an attempt to escape. She is unsuccessful, however, and from their union is born Phocus, whose name (phoke meaning "seal") recalls his mother's metamorphosis.

Peleus and Telamon are the sons of Aeacus by his wife Endeis. The two of them kill their half-brother Phocus, and they are subsequently exiled from Aegina by their father. The second story which features Psamathe involves her sending of a wolf at the herds of Peleus, out of revenge for her son's death. After the wolf eats part of Peleus' herd, it is turned to stone by either Psamathe herself, or her sister Thetis.

Sources 

Psamathe is first mentioned in Hesiod's Theogony (c. 730–700 BC), where she described as "Psamathe of charming figure" and "the fair goddess". Hesiod lists her among the Nereids, and calls her the mother of Phocus by Aeacus. Pindar (c. 518–438 BC), who calls her "Psamatheia" (Ψαμάθεια), says that she bore Phocus by the shore of the sea, while Euripides, in his play Helen (c. 412 BC), offers a very different account of Psamathe, in which, "after she left Aiakos' bed", she is the wife of Proteus, the king of Egypt, by whom she has two children, Theoclymenos and Eido (the latter of which is later known as Theonoe).

The myth of Psmathe's transformation into a seal comes from the mythographer Apollodorus (first or second century AD) and a scholiast on Euripides' play Andromache, while multiple versions of the story of the wolf are given by different authors. Ovid, in his Metamorphoses (c. 8 AD), presents the most detailed account. After Phocus is killed by his half-brothers Peleus and Telamon, they are exiled from the island of Aegina by their father Aeacus. Psamathe, out of revenge for her son's murder, sends at Peleus' herd of cattle a wolf that is described as a "huge beast", with "great, murderous jaws" and "eyes blazing with red fire". Peleus is informed of the wolf by his herdsman, and "well [knows] that the bereaved Nereid [is] sending this calamity upon him". In desperation, he prays to Psamathe to "put away her wrath and come to his help"; she remains unmoved, however, until her sister Thetis prays for her forgiveness alongside Peleus, at which point she transforms the wolf into what Ovid describes as "marble". Antoninus Liberalis (second to third century AD), in his Metamorphoses, presents a much briefer version, which he attributes to Nicander of Colophon (second century BC). In this version the origin of the wolf is not specified, and it is transformed into stone, not by Psamathe, but by "divine will". A wolf is similarly mentioned by the Hellenistic poet Lycophron (born 330–325 BC), in his Alexandra: "... the Wolf that devoured the atonement and was turned to stone ...". The byzantine poet John Tzetzes (c. 1110–1180), in his commentary on Lycophron's Alexandra, presents a version of the story in which Psamathe sends the wolf, but does not transform it herself; instead it is Thetis who turns it to stone.

Psamathe also appears in book 43 of Nonnus's Dionysiaca (c. fifth century AD), during the fight between Poseidon and Dionysus, where, from the beach, she pleads to Zeus to end the battle.

Iconography 

Psamathe is depicted on a number of Attic vases dating from the late fifth century BC. The iconography of Psamathe is typical for a Nereid, and she is depicted in such scenes as the fight between Peleus and Thetis, and the transportation of the weapons and armour of Achilles, where she is among the Nereids carrying his weaponry while riding on a dolphin.

Genealogy

Notes

References 

 Antoninus Liberalis, The Metamorphoses of Antoninus Liberalis: A Translation with a Commentary, edited and translated by Francis Celoria, Routledge, 1992. . Online version at ToposText.
 Apollodorus, Apollodorus. The Library, Volume I: Books 1-3.9, translated by James G. Frazer, Loeb Classical Library No. 121, Cambridge, Massachusetts, Harvard University Press, 1921. . Online version at Harvard University Press. Online version at the Perseus Digital Library.
 Brill’s New Pauly: Encyclopaedia of the Ancient World. Antiquity, Volume 11, Phi-Prok, editors: Hubert Cancik, Helmuth Schneider, Brill, 2007. . Online version at Brill.
 Brill’s New Pauly: Encyclopaedia of the Ancient World. Antiquity, Volume 12, Prol-Sar, editors: Hubert Cancik, Helmuth Schneider, Brill, 2008. . Online version at Brill.
 Caldwell, Richard, Hesiod's Theogony, Focus Publishing/R. Pullins Company (June 1, 1987). . Internet Archive.
 Dindorf, Karl Wilhelm, Scholia Graeca in Euripidis tragoedias, Volume IV, Oxford, E Typographeo Clarendoniano, 1863. Google Books.
 Euripides, Helen, translated by E. P. Coleridge in  The Complete Greek Drama, edited by Whitney J. Oates and Eugene O'Neill, Jr., Volume 2, New York, Random House, 1938. Online version at the Perseus Digital Library.
 Fontenrose, Joseph Eddy, Python: A Study of Delphic Myth and Its Origins, University of California Press, 1959. . Google Books.
 Frazer, James G., Apollodorus. The Library, Volume I: Books 1-3.9, Loeb Classical Library No. 121, Cambridge, Massachusetts, Harvard University Press, 1921. . Online version at Harvard University Press. Online version at the Perseus Digital Library.
 Gantz, Timothy, Early Greek Myth: A Guide to Literary and Artistic Sources, Johns Hopkins University Press, 1996, Two volumes:  (Vol. 1),  (Vol. 2).
 Grimal, Pierre, The Dictionary of Classical Mythology, Wiley-Blackwell, 1996. . Internet Archive.
 Hard, Robin, The Routledge Handbook of Greek Mythology: Based on H.J. Rose's "Handbook of Greek Mythology", Psychology Press, 2004. . Google Books.
 Hesiod, Theogony, in The Homeric Hymns and Homerica with an English Translation by Hugh G. Evelyn-White, Cambridge, Massachusetts, Harvard University Press; London, William Heinemann Ltd. 1914. Online version at the Perseus Digital Library. Internet Archive.
 Larson, Jennifer, Greek Nymphs: Myth, Cult, Lore, Oxford University Press, 2001. .
 Lycophron, Alexandra in Callimachus and Lycophron, with an English translation by A. W. Mair; Aratus, with an English translation by G. R. Mair, London: W. Heinemann, New York: G. P. Putnam, 1921. Online version at Harvard University Press. Internet Archive.
 March, Jenny, Cassell's Dictionary of Classical Mythology, Cassell & Co., 2001. . Internet Archive.
 Newton, Charles Thomas, "The Camirus Vase", in The Fine Arts Quarterly Review, Vol. 2, pp. 1–8. Google Books.
 Nonnus, Dionysiaca, Volume III: Books 36–48, translated by W. H. D. Rouse, Loeb Classical Library No. 346, Cambridge, Massachusetts, Harvard University Press; London, William Heinemann Ltd., 1940. . Online version at Harvard University Press. Internet Archive (1940, reprinted 1942).
 Ovid, Metamorphoses, Volume II: Books 9-15, translated by Frank Justus Miller, revised by G. P. Goold, Loeb Classical Library No. 43, Cambridge, Massachusetts, Harvard University Press, 1984, first published 1916. . Online version at Harvard University Press.
 Paschalis, Michael, "Narratives of amor, arma and armenta in Ovid’s Metamorphoses", in Trends in Classics, Vol. 12, No. 1, pp. 154–171. Online version at De Gruyter.
 Pausanias, Description of Greece, Volume I: Books 1-2 (Attica and Corinth), translated by W. H. S. Jones, Loeb Classical Library No. 93, Cambridge, Massachusetts, Harvard University Press, 1918. . Online version at Harvard University Press. Online version at the Perseus Digital Library.
 Pindar, Nemean Odes. Isthmian Odes. Fragments, edited and translated by William H. Race, Loeb Classical Library No. 485, Cambridge, Massachusetts, Harvard University Press, 1997. . Online version at Harvard University Press.
 Plutarch, Moralia, Volume IV: Roman Questions. Greek Questions. Greek and Roman Parallel Stories. On the Fortune of the Romans. On the Fortune or the Virtue of Alexander. Were the Athenians More Famous in War or in Wisdom?, translated by Frank Cole Babbitt, Loeb Classical Library No. 305, Cambridge, Massachusetts, Harvard University Press, 1936. . Online version at Harvard University Press.
 Richter, Gisela M. A., Red-Figured Athenian Vases in the Metropolitan Museum of Art, Volume I, Metropolitan Museum of Art, 1936. Google Books.
 Szabados, Anne-Violaine, "Psamathe", in Lexicon Iconographicum Mythologiae Classicae (LIMC) VII.1. Artemis Verlag, Zürich and Munich, 1994. . Internet Archive.
 Tripp, Edward, Crowell's Handbook of Classical Mythology, Thomas Y. Crowell Co; First edition (June 1970). . Internet Archive.
 Tzetzes, John, Scolia eis Lycophroon, edited by Christian Gottfried Müller, Sumtibus F.C.G. Vogelii, 1811. Internet Archive.

Nereids
Shapeshifters in Greek mythology
Sea and river goddesses
Metamorphoses into inanimate objects in Greek mythology